Amphipyra micans is a moth in the family Noctuidae. It is found from Bulgaria and the Balkans south to Greece, east to Turkey and south to Lebanon.

The wingspan is about 30 mm. Adults are on wing from July to September.

The larvae feed on Gallium mollugo.

External links
lepidoptera.pl

Amphipyrinae
Moths of Europe
Moths of the Middle East
Moths described in 1857